Herbert Wildon Carr (16 January 1857 – 8 July 1931) was a British philosopher, Professor of Philosophy, King's College, London from 1918 until 1925 and Visiting Professor at the University of Southern California from 1925 until his death.

He was a student at King's College London where he was awarded the Jelf Medal.

Works
 Henri Bergson: the philosophy of change, London: Jack, 1911
 The Problem of Truth, New York: Dodge, 1913
 The Philosophy of Benedetto Croce, London: Macmillan, 1917
 The General Principle of Relativity in Its Philosophical and Historical Aspect, London: Macmillan, 1922
 L'Énergie spirituelle, Translated by H. Wildon Carr as Mind-Energy: Lectures and Essays, London: Macmillan, 1920
 A Theory of Monads: Outlines of the Philosophy of the Principle of Relativity, London: Macmillan, 1922
 Scientific Approach to Philosophy: Selected Essays and Reviews, London: Macmillan, 1924
 Changing Backgrounds in Religion and Ethics: A Metaphysical Meditation, New York: Macmillan, 1927
 The Unique Status of Man, in, American Journal of Sociology, 1928
 The Freewill Problem, London: Benn Ltd., 1928
 Leibniz, Boston: Little Brown, 1929

References 
 http://www.nature.com/nature/journal/v128/n3220/abs/128098b0.html
 ‘CARR, Herbert Wildon’, Who Was Who,  A & C Black,   1920–2008;     online edn,   Oxford University Press, December 2007,   accessed 15 Feb 2012 
 Pierfrancesco Basile, "Herbert Wildon Carr" in Michel Weber, ed., Handbook of Whiteheadian Process Thought, Volume II (2008) pages 383-4
 "Carr, Herbert Wildon" in Brown, ed., Dictionary of Twentieth-Century British Philosophers
 Richard T. Hull, Presidential Addresses of The American Philosophical Association, 1921-1930, pages 439-440

External links
 
 
 

1857 births
1931 deaths
Alumni of King's College London
Associates of King's College London
Academics of King's College London
Fellows of King's College London
20th-century British philosophers
Presidents of the Aristotelian Society
University of Southern California faculty